Nikolaos Zafiropoulos (born 8 January 1974) is a Greek footballer who last played for PAS Giannina F.C.

Zafiropoulos began his playing career by signing with Panachaiki in June 1991.

References

External links
Guardian Football

1974 births
Living people
Greek footballers
Panachaiki F.C. players
A.O. Kerkyra players
Korinthos F.C. players
Atromitos F.C. players
Panegialios F.C. players
Patraikos F.C. players
Panserraikos F.C. players
Apollon Pontou FC players
Levadiakos F.C. players
PAS Giannina F.C. players
Association football goalkeepers